Miriata (aka Meryata) is a Sunni Muslim village in Zgharta District, in the North Governorate of Lebanon.

References

External links
 Miriata - Qadriyeh, Localiban
Ehden Family Tree

Populated places in the North Governorate
Zgharta District
Sunni Muslim communities in Lebanon